Dundalk Historic District is a national historic district in Baltimore, and Baltimore County, Maryland, United States. The district is a cohesive unit made up of residential, commercial, and institutional buildings with structures that generally date from 1910 to 1940.  Major architectural styles represented include Period Revival (particularly Colonial Revival and Tudor Revival) and Art Deco/Streamline Moderne. The District includes 962 resources contribute to its significance. It includes the only two housing developments built by the United States Shipping Board Merchant Fleet Corporation (EFC) in Maryland during World War I and reflects experimentation with Garden City planning ideals. Many of the buildings within the District represent the work of noted Baltimore architect Edward L. Palmer, Jr.

It was added to the National Register of Historic Places in 1985.

References

External links
, including photo dated 1984, at Maryland Historical Trust
Boundary Map of the Dundalk Historic District, Baltimore City and Baltimore County, at Maryland Historical Trust

Dundalk, Maryland
Historic districts in Baltimore
Historic districts in Baltimore County, Maryland
Colonial Revival architecture in Maryland
Tudor Revival architecture in Maryland
Historic districts on the National Register of Historic Places in Maryland
National Register of Historic Places in Baltimore County, Maryland